Good Omens is a British fantasy comedy series created and written by Neil Gaiman based on his and Terry Pratchett's 1990 novel of the same name. A six-episode coproduction between Amazon Studios and BBC Studios, the series was directed by Douglas Mackinnon, with Gaiman also serving as showrunner. Michael Sheen and David Tennant lead a large ensemble cast that also includes Adria Arjona, Miranda Richardson, Michael McKean, Jack Whitehall, Nick Offerman, Brian Cox, Mireille Enos, Jon Hamm, and Frances McDormand as the voice of God, who narrates the series.

Like the novel, Good Omens features various Christian themes and figures and follows various characters all trying to either encourage or prevent an imminent Armageddon, seen through the eyes of the angel Aziraphale and the demon Crowley.

All episodes of the first season were released on Amazon Prime Video on May 31, 2019, and aired weekly on BBC Two in the UK between January 15 and February 19, 2020. Although the show's first season was conceived and marketed as a limited series, it was renewed for a second series in June 2021; Sheen and Tennant are returning, along with most of the crew.

Premise
Set in 2018, the series follows the demon Crowley (David Tennant) and the angel Aziraphale (Michael Sheen), longtime acquaintances who have grown accustomed to each other's company, and to a pleasant life on Earth as representatives of Heaven and Hell, and who have agreed not to let the conflict between their sides prevent their friendship.  When told that Armageddon is about to happen - the final battle between heaven and hell - they team up to prevent the coming of the Antichrist and the end of the pleasant existence they enjoy on Earth.

Cast and characters

Main

 Michael Sheen as Aziraphale, an angel who has lived on Earth since the dawn of creation. He guarded the East gate entrance to the Garden of Eden with a flaming sword, which he gave to Adam and Eve on their expulsion from the Garden out of concern for their well-being. He has grown to love the finer things of human life, enjoys haute cuisine and owns an antiquarian bookshop in London.
 David Tennant as Crowley, a demon who has lived on Earth since the dawn of creation. Originally called "Crawly", he is the Serpent who tempted Eve with the apple from the tree of knowledge of good and evil.
 Daniel Mays as Arthur Young, father of Adam.
 Sian Brooke as Deirdre Young, mother of Adam.
 Ned Dennehy as Hastur, a demon.
 Ariyon Bakare as Ligur, a demon.
 Nick Offerman as Thaddeus Dowling, the US Ambassador to the UK and father of Warlock.
 Anna Maxwell Martin as Beelzebub, the leader of the forces of Hell.
 Nina Sosanya as Sister Mary Loquacious, a nun of the Chattering Order of St. Beryl, a satanic order of nuns who had to switch a human baby with the Antichrist. After the convent burns down, she becomes manager of the business management centre established on the same site.
 Doon Mackichan as Michael, an archangel.
 Sam Taylor Buck as Adam Young, the reluctant Antichrist accidentally placed in the custody of the Young family.
 Jon Hamm as Gabriel, the leader of the forces of Heaven. While Gabriel was only mentioned once in the original novel, his role was meant to be expanded in the unfinished sequel to Good Omens; Gaiman incorporated parts of the planned sequel into the TV series's plot. In the novel, the leader of the forces of Heaven was the Metatron.
 Frances McDormand as the voice of God, the narrator of the first series.
 Adria Arjona as Anathema Device, Agnes Nutter's last descendant and an occultist who eventually teams up with Newton Pulsifer to try and stop the end of the world.
 Miranda Richardson as Madame Tracy, a part-time medium and courtesan.
 Michael McKean as Witchfinder Sergeant Shadwell, the last officer of the once-proud witchfinder army.
 Jack Whitehall as Newton Pulsifer, a struggling computer engineer and descendant of witchfinder Thou-Shalt-Not-Commit-Adultery Pulsifer.
 Whitehall also portrays Thou-Shalt-Not-Commit-Adultery Pulsifer, the witchfinder who burned Agnes Nutter at the stake.
 Mireille Enos as War, one of the Four Horsemen of the Apocalypse that appears in the form of war correspondent Carmine "Red" Zingiber.
 Bill Paterson as R.P. Tyler, a member of the Tadfield Neighbourhood Watch and neighbour of the Young family.
 Yusuf Gatewood as Famine, one of the Four Horsemen of the Apocalypse who appears in the form of dietician and entrepreneur Raven Sable.
 Lourdes Faberes as Pollution: one of the Four Horsemen of the Apocalypse and appears in the place of Pestilence who has retired as a Horseman upon the discovery of penicillin.
 Brian Cox as Death, one of the Four Horsemen of the Apocalypse. Jamie Hill physically performs the character while Cox voices him.

Featured 
Actors credited in the opening titles of episodes in which they play a significant role.
 Steve Pemberton and Mark Gatiss as Glozier and Harmony respectively, book-buyers for der Führer during World War II.
 Reece Shearsmith as William Shakespeare
 David Morrissey as Captain Vincent, the captain of the cruise ship that runs aground on Atlantis.
 Simon Merrells as Leslie the International Express Man, a man who helps summon the Four Horsemen of the Apocalypse.
 Derek Jacobi as Metatron, the spokesperson for God.
 Johnny Vegas as Ron Ormerod
 Andy Hamilton as the voice of Hell's Usher.
 Benedict Cumberbatch as Satan, the ruler of Hell; Niall Greig Fulton performs motion-capture for the character while Cumberbatch voices him.

Recurring and guest

 Samson Marraccino as Warlock Dowling: the son of the Dowlings, mistakenly thought to be the Antichrist; he's actually Arthur and Deirdre Young's birth son.
 Jill Winternitz as Harriet Dowling: wife of Thaddeus and mother of Warlock.
 Paul Chahidi as Sandalphon
 Josie Lawrence as Agnes Nutter, the last true witch in England. Lawrence reprises her role from the Good Omens radio adaptation.
 Amma Ris as Pepper: one of Adam's friends.
 Ilan Galkoff as Brian: one of Adam's friends.
 Alfie Taylor as Wensleydale: one of Adam's friends.
 Gloria Obianyo as Uriel
 Nicholas Parsons and Elizabeth Berrington as Dagon. Parsons voices him in episode 1 while Berrington portrays Dagon in episodes 5 and 6.

Jonathan Aris appears as the Quartermaster Angel: an angel who gears up the angels for Armageddon. Adam Bond portrays Jesus, whose crucifixion is witnessed by Crowley and Aziraphale. Sanjeev Bhaskar portrays Giles Baddicombe, a lawyer. Steve Oram plays Horace, a motorist on the M25 hypnotised and burned alive by Crowley's sigil. Paul Kaye and Ben Crowe make vocal cameos: Kaye as a spokesman for an electricity board (impersonating the voice of Terry Pratchett) and Crowe as Freddie Mercury. Jayde Adams and Jenny Galloway play participants at Madame Tracy's seance. Dan Starkey plays a passerby comforting Aziraphale. Alistair Findley and Jim Meskimen cameo as George W. Bush with Findley physically portraying Bush and Meskimen voicing him. Kirsty Wark, Paul Gambaccini and Konnie Huq cameo as TV presenters. James Naughtie cameos as a radio presenter. Neil Gaiman cameos as a sleeping man in the cinema. Terry Pratchett's iconic hat and scarf appear in Aziraphale's bookshop.

Episodes

Production

Development
Pratchett and Gaiman had planned to adapt Good Omens as a movie for years, with various directors and writers attached to the project along the way. In 2011, a television series, written by Terry Jones and Gavin Scott, was first reported to be in the works but no further plans were announced. After Pratchett's death, Gaiman refused to ever consider working on the adaptation alone but changed his mind when he received a letter from Pratchett, written to be sent after his death, urging him to finish the project.

On January 19, 2017, it was announced that Amazon Prime Video had given a green-light to a television series adaptation of the novel to be co-produced with the BBC in the United Kingdom. Executive producers were set to include Gaiman, Caroline Skinner, Chris Sussman, Rob Wilkins, and Rod Brown. Gaiman was also set to adapt the novel for the screen and serve as showrunner for the series. Production companies involved with the series were slated to consist of BBC Studios, Narrativia, and The Blank Corporation. Distribution of the series was to be handled by BBC Worldwide.

On June 29, 2021, the series was renewed for a second season consisting of six episodes.

Casting

On August 14, 2017, it was announced that Michael Sheen and David Tennant had been cast in the lead roles of Aziraphale and Crowley, respectively. On September 14, 2017, Gaiman revealed on Twitter that Nina Sosanya, Ned Dennehy, and Ariyon Bakare had joined the main cast. A day later, Jack Whitehall, Michael McKean, Miranda Richardson, and Adria Arjona were announced as series regulars. A week after that, Sam Taylor Buck, Amma Ris, Ilan Galkoff, Alfie Taylor, Daniel Mays, and Sian Brooke were also cast. In October 2017, it was reported that Jon Hamm, Anna Maxwell Martin, Mireille Enos, Lourdes Faberes, and Yusuf Gatewood had joined the main cast. In November 2017, it was reported that Reece Shearsmith and Nicholas Parsons had also been cast. On 15 December 2017 it was reported that Derek Jacobi would voice the Metatron.

On 9 February 2018 it was announced that Steve Pemberton and Mark Gatiss had joined the series. On 6 March 2018, it was announced that Nick Offerman had been cast in a series regular role. On 20 July 2018, it was announced during Amazon's San Diego Comic-Con panel that Frances McDormand had been cast as the voice of God as well as the series' narrator. On 13 February 2019, Neil Gaiman announced that Benedict Cumberbatch would voice Satan with the character itself being a CGI creation.

Filming
The 109 days of principal photography for the series took place over a six-month period beginning September 18, 2017 and ending in early March 2018.  Shooting began throughout the UK with subsequent filming taking place in and around Cape Town, South Africa. In October 2017, the production was spotted filming in Surrey. The series also filmed in St James's Park and Tavistock Square in London and Hambleden.  The Soho area of London representing the street and Aziraphale's bookshop was created and shot in Hertfordshire at Bovingdon Airbase.  A vacant building in Weybridge, Surrey served as Heaven's corporate headquarters, and Hogback Wood, the location for Adam and his friends, was also filmed in Surrey. Bulstrode Park, just outside Gerrards Cross in Buckinghamshire, with its mansion and grounds, was used for the satanic convent/hospital and later the corporate training center. The American Army base was located and filmed in Upper Heyford, in Oxfordshire. The Weald and Downland Living Museum in West Sussex was used to film Agnes Nutter's burning at the stake. It was shot over a two-day period in October 2017.

The car in the novel is a 1926 Bentley, but neither Gaiman nor Pratchett really knew what a 1926 model looked like when they wrote Good Omens. For the television series, a 1933 model which had more of the look Gaiman had in mind was used.  The Bentley used in filming is valued at £250,000.
The second season began filming in later 2021 in Scotland.

Title sequence

Good Omens opening title sequence, created by the London-based Peter Anderson Studio, features music by David Arnold. When Douglas Mackinnon approached Anderson about the title sequence, Mackinnon said that he wanted something "over the top". His idea was to communicate the coming of Armageddon while also showing the humor and "fantastical tone", Crowley and Aziraphale's friendship, and the idea that good and evil are in everyone. The project was a new style of design by Anderson and his studio, and a unique design for a television series. Anderson described the result as "a totally bonkers mishmash of all animation styles in a way where they feel as if they belong together".

The actual production used physical props, animation, illustration, 3D and some live-action motion, to depict the approaching apocalypse and clash between Heaven and Hell. Studio employees were filmed in costume, on green screen; they were then cut out and animations were created. Each of the characters has either Crowley's or Aziraphale's face.

The title sequence incorporates all the characters from the series as they move towards the Apocalypse. Included are Crowley's Bentley in front of Aziraphale's bookshop, the Chattering Order of St. Beryl's nuns, Shadwell and Madame Tracy, the hellhound, flying saucers, the appearance of Death, and the Four Horsemen of the Apocalypse. Crowley's work on London's M25 is featured in the parade, along with various towns and areas of the world.  In the end, characters fall from earth, landing either in Heaven or Hell, leading into the Good Omens title artwork. The entire sequence runs one minute and 40 seconds.

Costumes
Claire Anderson was costume designer for Good Omens. She received a 2019 Emmy nomination for Outstanding Fantasy/Sci-Fi Costumes for Episode 3, Hard Times.  Early design centered on main characters Aziraphale and Crowley; Anderson worked closely with actors Michael Sheen and David Tennant to design their modern-day looks. Once created, they were an important influence on their other  attire throughout history.

Crowley's look reflects his transformation into human form from a serpent. The costume is modern, black, almost goth-like in style, including a "snake head" belt buckle. He often wears dark glasses to conceal his serpent eyes. His outfits always have a hint of red, including red soles on his shoes or red lining on his gloves, representing his demon snake's red belly. His jackets had a red lining on the underside of the collar.  Aziraphale's outfits were the opposite of Crowley's, reflecting his ethereal nature. His angel-inspired costumes included cuff-links, a signet ring, and a pocket watch, all containing angel wings.  His off-white color palette and style maintained a Victorian Era look through modern times, with oversized lapels and shoulders representing his Angel wings.

Other costume inspirations came from details described in the Pratchett/Gaiman 1990 book. The modern-day character, Anathema Device, distantly related to prophetess Agnes Nutter, wears a Victorian "witchy look." Actor Jack Whitehall, as would-be witch-hunter Newt Pulsifer, was dressed with coat badges and epaulets with the accent color mustard, merging modern geeky Newt with his 17th-century ancestor. He also wanted the "odd socks" from the book incorporated into his costume. Claire Anderson's idea for Jon Hamm, as Angel Gabriel, was to look perfect. She found the material on Bond Street; it was "light, ethereal and ephemeral."  The suits were cashmere and made by Italian label Zegna. Hamm wore lilac contact lenses to emphasize the lilac in his "pearl gray" suit. The Satanic Nuns of the Chattering Order's costumes were created to look like regular nun habits but with a demonic undertone. Anderson looked at nuns through the years and chose to use "peaky hats", which had a more witch-like feeling rather than an evil one. The costumes included a luciferian pendant and symbolic watches. The demons from Hell, Lord Beelzebub, Duke Hastur and Ligur, wore carefully blackened clothing with shredded hems to appear as if scorched in Hell. Mr and Mrs. Young, the Antichrist Adam's parents, were dressed in a nostalgic, "timeless and comforting" 1950s look to represent their dependability. Anderson used her own parents' friends as inspiration. Sergeant Shadwell is "grubby",  wearing drab colors reflecting it. His defining look is a jacket with elements of a uniform to represent his Witchfinder Army role. Madame Tracy wore costumes reflecting her dual jobs as psychic reader and sex worker. "Flowing gowns" and colours reflecting "kookiness" were used for her mystic persona, while an ostentatious kimono represented her "lady of the night" role.  Many costumes had visual effects, added later, which required small tape markers in the shape of green crosses on people's bodies.

The cold opening, featuring a flashback through history in Episode 3, required costumes representing historical periods from the Garden of Eden in 4004 BC to Soho, London in 1967. Anderson took inspiration from pre-Raphaelite paintings, and from hippie clothes from the movie Serpico.  Throughout the epochs, each costume reflected the period as well as the Angel/Demon aspect of the characters. The scene with Crowley and Aziraphale in armor has black throughout Crowley's armor while Aziraphale's is silvery and light. A snakeskin-like texture is part of the robes and gowns Crowly wears in ancient times.

Special effects
London-based Milk VFX was chosen to create all the visual effects for Good Omens. Jean-Claude Deguara, co-founder, began work in the pre-production, pre-script stage of the series.  During pre-production the six scripts were broken down to work out how the VFX could interact effectively with the story in each episode.  Neil Gaiman was a constant source of help as he could quote from the book to help with creative decisions. The goal was to use in-camera shots wherever possible. The Noah's Ark scene in Episode 3 used live-action elements wherever possible, including the smaller animals. Larger animals were added in post-production. Special effects were to be used as part of the scene and "grounded in reality", not to stand out on their own. 60 visual-effect specialists, the most Milk had used on a single project, worked over a two-year period to create a wide range of effects. 650 CG shots were created for the six episodes.  Post-production time was five months.

Deguara and his crew created a wide range of effects including creatures, environments and fire. Among the environments created was a penthouse for Heaven with "ever-changing" views of the famous landmarks of the world. The escalator to Hell was filmed in a modern office building in London, using real-time cinematography as well as a green screen for special effects depicting Crowley's descent from the lobby. The Soho site for Aziraphale's bookshop, built at Bovington Airfield, used a green screen to extend the streets in post-production. The site was built because Aziraphale's bookshop had to burn down with real fire, not just visual effects, which want possible in Soho. The opening scene of Episode 1 at the Garden of Eden, filmed in South Africa, included "many green screen and interactive VFX" to create a big visual effects scene. Episode 4 featured a visual effect of Crowley (David Tennant) flying through the telephone system, chased by Hastur, the Duke of Hell (Ned Dennehy). Tennant was in a rig that allowed him to "twist and roll at speed" while Dennehy used a wire. To make Tennant's part look realistic and hide the rig, digitally created "glitch-type movements" were created.

Crowley's Bentley, prominently seen through the series, is often shown racing through London at speeds over 100 mph. The car had to look authentic, but no real Bentley would have been able to go this fast. The filming was one of the first effects Milk VFX learned about. After locating a real Bentley, CG assets were created for the scenes on the street as well as inside the Bentley. The car used is actually a combination of five different CG, real, and built versions. The Bentley that blew up in Episode 6 is real. The interior was removed and the exterior blown up. Rather than using digital effects to create the scenery as Crowley is driving, director of photography Gavin Finney used an older technique called rear projection. Films are first made of passing scenery from all sides of a moving vehicle; then, on the set, the filmed scenes are projected onto a screen. Finney explained: "It means you see the footage as well as reflections on the glass or the driver's face, say as the vehicle goes under trees, while it also works as a lighting source."

The model for the Hellhound was a Great Dane dog with similar coloring to the small dog used later. Using a blue screen, the live dog was filmed, then partially enlarged in CG to create the monstrous head and neck. The effect was used for a couple of scenes, but the transformation to a small dog used a real dog.  The final episode features a confrontation between Adam Young, the child Antichrist, and Satan, his "father who is no longer in Heaven". The original concept of Satan was much more "hellish"; however, Neil Gaiman wanted a more human form of the 500-foot-tall creature, rather than including "hellfire" and over-the-top demonic action. Certain effects were scaled back in the rise of Satan from Hell, so that the focus became the more "human" interaction between a father and a rebellious son who rejects him. Sound effects such as body sounds, rocks and moving earth were used to emphasize Satan's size and power. Other visual effects included a short demon named Usher, sacrificed to test holy water; a kraken rising in the sea; wings for Crowley and Aziraphale; and maggots overwhelming a call center when Hastur escapes after being trapped in Crowley's voicemail. Crowley's snake eyes were created using contact lenses for the most part, but were digitally enhanced for close-ups.

Music
Good Omens features music written by Emmy winning composer David Arnold, along with quite a few Queen songs throughout the series. Arnold received two Emmy nominations for Outstanding Main Title theme and for the episode "In the Beginning." He said his work on Good Omens was unlike any he had done. "It might be the hardest I've worked on anything." He described the series as "a universe-sized show in need of a universe-sized score."  He called the opening theme "a kind of wicked, slightly, devilish, Mephistophelean waltz—it has a feeling of twirling, out-of-control-ness." He rewrote the main theme for each episode to reflect what happened in it.

Arnold used unusual instrumentation to create themes for episodes and themes, including lutes, lyres, bass brass and drums, and harps, depending on their imagery or emotion. He wanted to combine "heavenly" and "satanic" elements so that when something sounded good, there was also an element of bad. He said, "Whenever there was a sweet violin, there would be its nasty brother lurking alongside it. The use of Queen's music, reflecting a running gag of the novel where every tape Crowley put on this car stereo turned out to be of said band, included a brass band arrangement of "Lazing on a Sunday Afternoon". Arnold was a Queen fan as a teenager, studying how they created sounds, and said the choirs and chorale sounds in certain parts of the series reflected this influence.

Release

The six episodes of the series were released on Amazon Prime Video on May 31, 2019, and aired weekly on BBC Two between January 15 and February 19, 2020.

David Tennant and Michael Sheen reprised their respective roles in voice-only form for a 3-minute short titled "Good Omens: Lockdown" which was released on YouTube on May 1, 2020. The short imagines how their characters might be doing in isolation during the COVID-19 pandemic.

Marketing
On October 6, 2018, the series held a panel at the annual New York Comic Con in New York City. It was moderated by Whoopi Goldberg and featured creator Neil Gaiman, director Douglas Mackinnon, and cast members Michael Sheen, David Tennant, Jon Hamm and Miranda Richardson. During the panel, the series' first trailer was premiered and subsequently released online.

AT SXSW 2019, Amazon Prime hosted a Good Omens "Garden of Eden" Party in Austin, Texas during the entire week of the festival. The party was hosted by performers dressed as angels and demons, with free food, hair and nail services, and a complimentary bar. David Tennant, Michael Sheen, Jon Hamm, Douglas Mackinnon and Neil Gaiman made guest appearances, and an episode of the series received an early screening at the Zach Theatre. A party hosted at the Garden by Entertainment Weekly featured a fire-breather and a  Queen cover band. Good Omens-branded umbrellas and tote bags were handed out at the pop-up experience, and the Garden featured a petting zoo full of local puppies called "Hell Hounds".

Reception
Good Omens has received generally positive reviews. On Rotten Tomatoes, it has an approval rating of 84% based on 97 reviews, with an average score of 7.28 out of 10. The site's critical consensus reads: "A smörgåsbord of heavenly imagery and irreverent hilarity, Good Omens works thanks to Michael Sheen and David Tennant's very-nearly-holy (or maybe unholy?) chemistry—though, at only six episodes long, it's a rare adaptation that may have benefited from being a little less faithful to the good book." On Metacritic it has a score of 66% based on reviews from 21 critics, indicating "generally favorable reviews".

Petition for cancellation
An online petition erroneously requesting that Netflix cancel Good Omens reportedly received more than 20,000 signatures from people objecting to its content, perhaps unaware that it was actually on Amazon and had already been released in full. The petition, posted as part of a campaign by US religious organization Return to Order, criticized the show's irreverent treatment of topics relating to satanism and the devil, and the use of a female voice for God. The original petition was removed from the site, corrected and reposted.

Accolades

See also
 List of films about angels

References

External links
 
 

2019 American television series debuts
2019 British television series debuts
2010s American comedy television series
2020s American comedy television series
2010s British comedy television series
2020s British comedy television series
American fantasy television series
British fantasy television series
English-language television shows
Amazon Prime Video original programming
Adaptations of works by Terry Pratchett
Angels in television
Bookstores in fiction
Fantasy comedy television series
Cultural depictions of William Shakespeare
Demons in television
Fictional depictions of the Antichrist
Four Horsemen of the Apocalypse in popular culture
Fiction about God
Heaven in popular culture
Hell in popular culture
Religious comedy television series
Television series based on works by Neil Gaiman
Television series by Amazon Studios
Television series by BBC Studios
Television series set in 2018
Television shows about precognition
Television shows filmed in South Africa
Television shows filmed in England
Television shows filmed in Scotland
Television shows set in London
Television shows set in Oxfordshire
Witch hunting in fiction
Witchcraft in television
Hugo Award for Best Dramatic Presentation, Long Form winning works